The Tunisian Athletics Championships is an annual outdoor track and field competition organised by the Tunisian Athletics Federation, which serves as the national championship for the sport in Tunisia.

Events
The competition programme features a total of 34 individual Tunisian Championship athletics events, 17 for men and 17 for women. There are six track running events, three obstacle events, four jumps, and four throws.

Track running
100 metres, 200 metres, 400 metres, 800 metres, 1500 metres, 3000 metres (women only) 5000 metres (men only)
Obstacle events
100 metres hurdles (women only), 110 metres hurdles (men only), 400 metres hurdles, 3000 metres steeplechase
Jumping events
Pole vault, high jump, long jump, triple jump
Throwing events
Shot put, discus throw, javelin throw, hammer throw
Combined events
Heptathlon (women only), decathlon (men only)

In addition to the individual track and field titles, there are national championships in 20 kilometres race walk (both individual and relay), club relay championships (4 × 100 m, 4 × 200 m, 4 × 400 m, 4 × 800 m, and 4 × 1 500 m), road running championships over 10K run, half marathon and marathon distances, and long and short course cross country running competitions.

Winners
The national club competition takes place within the individual national championships, with the club with the most successful athletes winning the national club title.

 1956 : L'Orientale
 1957 : Joyeuse union
 1958 : Club sportif des cheminots
 1959 : L'Orientale
 1960 : L'Orientale
 1961 : L'Orientale
 1962 : Centre d'éducation physique militaire
 1963 : Zitouna Sports 
 1964 : L'Orientale
 1965 : Zitouna Sports 
 1966 : L'Orientale
 1967 : Club africain
 1968 : Zitouna Sports
 1969 : Club africain
 1970 : Club africain
 1971 : Club africain
 1972 : Club africain
 1973 : Zitouna Sports
 1974 : Zitouna Sports
 1975 : Zitouna Sports 
 1976 : Zitouna Sports 
 1977 : Zitouna Sports 
 1978 : Zitouna Sports
 1979 : Zitouna Sports
 1980 : Zitouna Sports
 1981 : Zitouna Sports
 1982 : Zitouna Sports
 1983 : Zitouna Sports
 1984 : Zitouna Sports
 1985 : Zitouna Sports
 1986 : Zitouna Sports
 1987 : Zitouna Sports
 1988 : Zitouna Sports
 1989 : Club sportif de la Garde nationale
 1990 : Athletic Club de Nabeul
 1991 : Club sportif de la Garde nationale et Athletic Club de Nabeul
 1992 : Club sportif de la Garde nationale 
 1993 : Club sportif de la Garde nationale
 1994 : Club sportif de la Garde nationale
 1995 : Athletic Club de Nabeul
 1996 : Club sportif de la Garde nationale
 1997 : Club sportif de la Garde nationale
 1998 : Club sportif de la Garde nationale
 1999 : Club sportif de la Garde nationale
 2000 : Club sportif de la Garde nationale
 2001 : Club sportif de la Garde nationale
 2002 : Club sportif de la Garde nationale
 2003 : Club sportif de la Garde nationale
 2004 : Club sportif de la Garde nationale 
 2005 : Club sportif de la Garde nationale
 2006 : Club sportif de la Garde nationale
 2007 : Club sportif de la Garde nationale
 2008 : Club sportif de la Garde nationale 
 2009 : Club sportif de la Garde nationale
 2010 : Club sportif de la Garde nationale
 2011 : Zitouna Sports
 2012 : Club sportif de la Garde nationale
 2013 : Club municipal d'athlétisme de Kairouan
 2014 : Club municipal d'athlétisme de Kairouan
 2015 : Athletic Club de Sousse
 2016 : Club sportif de la Garde nationale

References

Tunisian Championships. GBR Athletics. Retrieved 2019-06-23.

 
Athletics competitions in Tunisia
National athletics competitions
Recurring sporting events established in 1956
Athletics